The Russell Small Cap Completeness Index measures the performance of the companies in the Russell 3000 Index excluding the companies in the S&P 500. , the index contains 2,561 holdings. It provides a performance standard for active money managers seeking a liquid extended benchmark, and can be used for a passive investment strategy in the extended market. Weighted average market capitalization is approximately $15.4 billion.

The index, which was launched on April 1, 2000, is maintained by FTSE Russell, a subsidiary of the London Stock Exchange Group. Its ticker symbol is ^RSCC.

Top 10 holdings
Square Inc.
Uber Technologies
Zoom Video Communications
Twilio Inc.
Moderna
Workday Inc.
DocuSign
Veeva Systems
Lululemon Athletica
Roku Inc.
()

Top sectors by weight
Financial Services
Consumer Discretionary
Technology
Producer Durables
Health Care

See also
Russell Indexes
Russell 2500 Index
Wilshire 4500

References

External links
Russell Index Fact Sheet
Yahoo! Finance page for ^RSCC

American stock market indices